Michel del Castillo (a.k.a. Michel Janicot del Castillo) born in 1933 in Madrid is a French writer.

Biography

Michel del Castillo was born in Madrid. His father, Michel Janicot, was French and his mother, Cándida Isabel del Castillo, Spanish.

Interned in the concentration camp Rieucros in Mende with his mother during the Second World War, he developed a sense of belonging to this town, which has honored him by naming a school after him.

He first studied politics and psychology, then turned to literature. Influenced by Miguel de Unamuno and Fyodor Dostoevsky, his books received many literary prizes, namely Prix Chateaubriand for Le Silence des Pierres (1975); Renaudot for La nuit du Décret (1981); Prix Maurice Genevoix for Rue des Archives (1994); Prix de l’Écrit Intime for Mon frère l’Idiot (1995); and Prix Femina essai for Colette, une Certaine France (2001).

In 1997 he became a member of the Académie royale de langue et de littérature françaises de Belgique, succeeding to Georges Duby.

Aside from travelling, he is very keen on classical music, and considered at some point making a career as a pianist.

Bibliography
 Tanguy (A Child of Our Time) (1957)
 La Guitare (1958)
 Le Colleur d’affiches (The Disinherited) (1959)
 Le manège espagnol (1960)
 Tara (1962)
 Gérardo Laïn (1967) English translation, "The Seminarian" (1969)
 Les écrous de la haine (1968), essay
 Le Vent de la Nuit (1973), Prix des Libraires and Prix des Deux Magots
 Le silence des pierres (1975), Prix Chateaubriand
 Le sortilège espagnol (1977)
 Les cyprès meurent en Italie (1979)
 La Nuit du décret (1981), Prix Renaudot
 La gloire de Dina (1984)
 La halte et le chemin (1985)
 Seville (1986)
 Le démon de l'oubli (1987)
 Mort d'un poète (1989)
 Une femme en soi (1991), Prix du Levant
 Andalousie (1991)
 Le crime des pères (1993), Grand prix RTL-Lire
 Carlos Pradal (1993), co-written with Yves Belaubre
 Rue des Archives (1994), Prix Maurice Genevoix
 Mon frère l’Idiot (1995), Prix de l’écrit intime
 Le sortilège espagnol : les officiants de la mort (1996)
 La tunique d'infamie (1997)
 De père français (1998)
 Colette, une certaine France (1999), Prix Femina
 L’Adieu au siècle, journal de l'année 1999 (2000)
 Droit d’auteur (2000), pamphlet
 Les étoiles froides (2001)
 Colette en voyage (2002)
 Une répétition (2002), a play on Jean Sénac
 Algérie, l’extase et le sang (2002), essay
 Les portes du sang (2003)
 Le Jour du destin (2003), play
 Sortie des artistes (2004)
 Dictionnaire amoureux de L’Espagne (2005), Prix Méditerranée
 La mémoire de Grenade (2005), play
 La Religieuse de Madrigal (2006), novel
 La Vie mentie (2007), novel
 Le Temps de Franco (2008), narration.

References

Interview by Emmanuel Davidenkoff ("Les Enfants de la Musique") on France Musique", Saturday December 18, 2010.

1933 births
Living people
Writers from Madrid
20th-century French novelists
20th-century French male writers
21st-century French novelists
20th-century French dramatists and playwrights
21st-century French dramatists and playwrights
Prix Renaudot winners
Prix des Deux Magots winners
Prix Maurice Genevoix winners
Prix Femina essai winners
Prix des libraires winners
Spanish emigrants to France
French male novelists
21st-century French male writers